Perithoedae or Perithoidai was a deme of ancient Attica, of the phyle Oineïs; it provided three delegates to the Athenian Boule.

The site of Perithoedae is located in the Kephisos valley, west of modern Athens.

People
Thraseas and Euandria, whose grave relief is preserved in the Pergamon Museum, Berlin

References

Populated places in ancient Attica
Former populated places in Greece
Demoi